Pseudolaubuca is a genus of cyprinid fish from eastern Asia.  There are currently four species in this genus.

Species
 Pseudolaubuca engraulis (Nichols, 1925)
 Pseudolaubuca hotaya Đ. Y. Mai, 1978
 Pseudolaubuca jouyi (D. S. Jordan & Starks, 1905)
 Pseudolaubuca sinensis Bleeker, 1864

References
 

 
Cyprinid fish of Asia
Cyprinidae genera